Appayya is a 2013 Kannada-language romance film written, directed and co-produced by S. Narayan. Srinagar Kitty and Bhama star. After much delay in finding the release date, the film finally made its premier across Karnataka on 13 September 2013.

It was remade in Bangladesh in 2016 as Angaar starring Om and Jolly.

Cast
Srinagar Kitty as Appayya
Bhama as Gowra
Indrakumar
Suresh Chandra
Asha Rani
S. Narayan

Soundtrack

Release

Critical reception 
A critic from The Times of India wrote that "There is nothing in this film that Sandalwood viewers haven’t seen before".

References

External links

2013 films
2010s Kannada-language films
Indian romance films
2013 romance films
Films directed by S. Narayan
Kannada films remade in other languages